The Cane Patch is a historic site near Everglades City, Florida, United States. On November 5, 1996, it was added to the U.S. National Register of Historic Places.

References

External links
  at 

National Register of Historic Places in Monroe County, Florida
National Register of Historic Places in Everglades National Park